Proxatrypanius rockefelleri is a species of beetle in the family Cerambycidae, the only species in the genus Proxatrypanius.

References

Acanthocinini